The Okamoto–Uchiyama cryptosystem is a public key cryptosystem proposed  in 1998 by Tatsuaki Okamoto and Shigenori Uchiyama. The system works in the multiplicative group of integers modulo n, where n is of the form p2q and p and q are large primes.

Operation

Like many public key cryptosystems, this scheme works in the group . This scheme is homomorphic and hence malleable.

Key generation
A public/private key pair is generated as follows:

 Compute .
 Choose a random integer  such that .
 Compute .

Encryption
A message  can be encrypted with the public key  as follows.

 Choose a random integer .
 Compute .

Decryption
An encrypted message  can be decrypted with the private key  as follows.
 Compute .
 Compute .  and  will be integers.
 Using the Extended Euclidean Algorithm, compute the inverse of  modulo :
.
 Compute .

Example
Then . Select . Then .

Now to encrypt a message , we pick a random  and compute .

To decrypt the message 43, we compute
 .
 .
 .
And finally .

Proof of correctness
We wish to prove that the value computed in the last decryption step, is equal to the original message . We have

So to recover  we need to take the discrete logarithm with base .

The group
.

.

The map  should be thought of as a logarithm from the cyclic group H to the additive group , and it is easy to check that L(ab) = L(a) + L(b), and that the L is an isomorphism between these two groups. As is the case with the usual logarithm, L(x)/L(g) is, in a sense, the logarithm of x with base g.

which is accomplished by

Security

The security of the entire message can be shown to be equivalent to factoring n. This is very similar to the quadratic residuosity problem and the higher residuosity problem.

References

Public-key encryption schemes